Wazeeran, also known as Nawab Nigar Mahal Sahiba, was an Indian courtesan (tawaif). She was frequented by Last Nawab of Lucknow, Wajid Ali Shah. He is said to have made her protégé, Ali Naqi Khan, his Wazir (Chief Minister) when he became king. She was the daughter of courtesan, Bibi Jan.

References

Indian courtesans
19th-century Indian women
19th-century Indian people
Royal mistresses